Robert Jeremy Goltho Grantham  (born 6 October 1938) is a British investor and co-founder and chief investment strategist of Grantham, Mayo, & van Otterloo (GMO), a Boston-based asset management firm. GMO had more than US$118 billion in assets under management as of March 2015. GMO has seen this number halve to US$65 billion in assets under management as of Dec 2020. He has been a vocal critic of various governmental responses to the Global Financial Crisis from 2007 to 2010. Grantham started one of the world's first index funds in the early 1970s.

In 2011 he was included in the 50 Most Influential ranking of Bloomberg Markets magazine.

Early life 
Grantham was born in Ware, Hertfordshire and grew up in Doncaster. He studied Economics at the University of Sheffield. In 1966, he completed an MBA at Harvard Business School.

Investment philosophy
Grantham's investment philosophy can be summarised by his commonly used phrase "reversion to the mean." Essentially, he believes that all asset classes and markets will revert to mean historical levels from highs and lows. His firm seeks to understand historical changes in markets and predict results for seven years into the future. When there is deviation from historical means (averages), the firm may take an investment position based on anticipated return to the mean. The firm allocates assets based on internal predictions of market direction.

Grantham has been described as a contrarian investor and permabear.

In 1971, Grantham helped established one of the earliest index funds at Batterymarch Financial Management. The idea was unusual at the time and the fund was not a success.

Views on market bubbles and the 2007–2008 credit crisis
Grantham built much of his investing reputation over the course of his career by identifying speculative asset bubbles as they were unfolding. Grantham avoided investing in Japanese equities and real estate in the late 1980s during the peak of the Japanese asset price bubble, and avoided technology stocks during the Internet bubble of the 1990s. A decade later, he limited his exposure to the housing bubble. Writing in Kiplinger in 2010, Elizabeth Leary noted that many of Grantham's predictions can be confirmed by analysis of his past newsletters. In a 2021 interview, Grantham distinguishes between identifying overpriced asset bubbles (which he believes is not particularly difficult), and predicting when such bubbles will collapse (which he admits is impossible, stating only that asset bubbles will eventually end at an uncertain future date). Grantham also acknowledges his strategy can underperform market averages for years, testing the patience of his clients, but he asserts that his strategy has always paid off long-term by avoiding overvalued assets.

In GMO's April 2010 Quarterly Letter Grantham spoke to the tendency for all bubbles to revert to the mean saying:

In his Fall 2008 GMO letter, Grantham commented on his evaluation of the underlying causes of the then-ongoing world credit crisis:

Grantham focused on the issue of personal traits and leadership in trying to explain how we reached the current economic crisis.

Views on fossil fuels and the Keystone pipeline
Grantham has repeatedly stated his opinion that the rising cost of energy – the most fundamental commodity –  between 2002 and 2008 has falsely inflated economic growth and GDP figures worldwide and that we have been in a "carbon bubble" for approximately the last 250 years in which energy was very cheap. He believes that this bubble is coming to an end. He has stated his opposition to the Keystone Pipeline on the basis of the ruinous environmental consequences that its construction will bring to Alberta and to the entire planet due to the contribution that burning the extracted oil would make to climate change.

Timber investment
Grantham is known to be a strong advocate for investments in the timber industry that also relies on trees for biomass/biofuel (wood chips). The potential conflict of interest with Grantham's philanthropic engagement for the "beyond coal" campaign of the Sierra Club was criticized in Jeff Gibbs' documentary Planet of the Humans.

Philanthropy
Grantham, together with his wife Hannelore, established the Grantham Foundation For the Protection of the Environment in 1997. Substantial commitments have been made to Imperial College London, the London School of Economics and the University of Sheffield, to establish the Grantham Institute - Climate Change and Environment, the Grantham Research Institute on Climate Change and the Environment and the Grantham Centre for Sustainable Futures, respectively, which will enable the institutions to build on their extensive expertise in climate change research. The 2011 tax filing for the Grantham Foundation for the Protection of the Environment shows the Foundation donated $1 million to both the Sierra Club and to Nature Conservancy, and $2 million to the Environmental Defense Fund that year. The Foundation has also provided support to Greenpeace, the WWF, Rare and the Smithsonian. From 2006 to 2012, The Grantham Foundation for Protection of the Environment funded a $75,000 prize for environmental reporting. The prize was administered by the University of Rhode Island's Metcalf Institute for Marine & Environmental Reporting.

In August 2019, he dedicated 98% (approximately $1 billion) of his personal wealth to fight climate change. Grantham believes that investing in green technologies, is a profitable investment in the long run, claiming that decarbonizing the economy will be an investing bonanza for those who know it’s coming.

Awards and honours

Grantham was elected a member of the American Academy of Arts and Sciences. With his wife, Hannelore, he received the Carnegie Medal for Philanthropy.

He was appointed Commander of the Order of the British Empire (CBE) in the 2016 Birthday Honours for philanthropic service to climate change research.
2009 Honorary degree, Imperial College, London.
2010 Honorary degree, The New School, New York.
2012 Honorary degree, The University of Sheffield.

See also
Edward Chancellor, worked with Grantham at GMO
Everything bubble

References

External links 
 GMO Website
 The Grantham Foundation
 Time to Wake Up: Days of Abundant Resources and Falling Prices Are Over Forever
Jeremy Grantham on population growth, China and climate sceptics by Leo Hickman, The Guardian 15 April 2013
  Jeremy Grantham on global economy | CNBC  Television | published on Mar 7, 2019 | youtube.com 
 Jeremy Grantham's "Race of Our Lives" speech -- presented in Chicago at the 2018 Morningstar Investment Conference (video and text)

Living people
American investors
Alumni of the University of Sheffield
Harvard Business School alumni
People from Ware, Hertfordshire
People from Doncaster
Commanders of the Order of the British Empire
1938 births
Giving Pledgers
21st-century philanthropists